The Parker 51 is a fountain pen first introduced in 1941. Parker marketed it as “The World’s Most Wanted Pen,” a slogan alluding to restrictions on production of consumer goods for civilian markets in the United States during World War II.
Parker's continual advertising during the war created demand that took several years to fulfil after the end of the conflict.

The pen and the ink were both named "51" to mark 1939, the company's 51st anniversary, during which development for the pen was completed (U.S. design patent No. 116,097,  filed). By giving the pen a number instead of a name, Parker avoided the problem of translating a name into other languages.

Design and history 

The "51" was innovative for the period. With a number of new design features in particular its hooded, tubular nib and multi-finned collector, were designed to work in conjunction with the pen's proprietary ink. This allowed the tubular nib to stay wet and lay down an even line with either the ultra-fast drying '51' ink or conventional inks. The initial model used a Vacumatic filling system which operated by pressing a plunger to generate a vacuum drawing ink into the pen.

The filling system was re-designed in 1948, with the introduction of the Aerometric filling system. This filling system operated by pressing a pressure bar on "Pli-Glass" sac.

In addition, Parker reformulated its "51" ink, reducing the alkalinity, and introducing a selection of brilliant colors, and calling the ink Superchrome. Like the 51 ink, it also came with a warning that it should be used only in the Parker 51 but the warning was more discreet.

The pen was not named after the P-51 Mustang fighter plane; but Parker took advantage of the coincidence by comparing the pen and the plane in its advertising.

The Parker "51" stayed in production until 1972 with a series of revisions throughout its production cycle.

Ink
There were two iterations of a special ink formulated exclusively for use in the Parker 51.

This initial ink was highly alkaline and while water-based, also included a substantial amount of isopropyl alcohol.

It was released in 1941 as "51" ink, along with the Parker 51 pen. Parker was careful to print prominent warnings on caps, labels, and boxes that the ink could only be used in the "51." The formulation in the ink would react with other manufacturing materials (such as celluloid) of the period leading to irreparable damage to other fountain pens. In 1948, the '51' ink was withdrawn and replaced with "Superchrome" ink, also advertised for the '51' pen and its economy model, the Parker "21" as the ink would still harm other fountain pens. "Superchrome" was discontinued by the early 1960s. Although Parker no longer manufactures these specially formulated inks, the pen's construction is suitable for most modern inks such as Parker's Quink.

Legacy
A pilot who is suspected of falsifying flight records in their logbook in order to overstate their actual experience is said to have logged "P-51 hours".

The 51 is popular with pen collectors, and in 2002 Parker issued a lookalike model called the 51 Special Edition. In 2004, the Parker 100 was released. It was a larger and heavier version of the original Parker 51. The pen was designed by Geoff Hollington, a furniture designer that had previously collaborated with Parker in the Sonnet and Insignia models. The model was produced from 2004 to 2007 and was advertised as "the perfect combination of understated status and sharp, individual style". Parker 100 was offered in bronze, blue, white, silver, and black.

In 2021 a reimagined version of Parker "51" was released. The 2021 model had slight differents with its predecessor, being 4mm longer than the original 51.

Queen Elizabeth used a burgundy Parker 51 since the 1950s. Parker as a company has received a Royal warrant of appointment as the official providers of writing instruments for the Royal Family.

References

Writing implements
1941 introductions
Parker pens